The Colorado Trail is a 1938 American western film directed by Sam Nelson, starring Charles Starrett, Iris Meredith and Bob Nolan.

Cast
 Charles Starrett as Grant Bradley
 Iris Meredith as Joan Randall
 Bob Nolan as Bob Nolan
 Edward LeSaint as Jeff Randall
 Al Bridge as 	Mark Sheldon
 Robert Fiske as 	Deacon Webster
 Dick Curtis as Henchman Slash Driscoll
 Hank Bell as Tombstone Terry
 Edward Peil Sr. as Hobbs
 Edmund Cobb as Cameron
 Jack Rube Clifford as Judge Bennett 
 George Chesebro as Hadely 
 Sons of the Pioneers as 	Musicians

References

Bibliography
 Pitts, Michael R. Western Movies: A Guide to 5,105 Feature Films. McFarland, 2012.

External links
 

1938 films
1938 Western (genre) films
American Western (genre) films
Films directed by Sam Nelson
American black-and-white films
Columbia Pictures films
1930s English-language films
1930s American films